Charles Joseph Carroll (September 1, 1882 – August 15, 1942) was an American lawyer and politician from New York.

Life 
Carroll was born on September 1, 1882, in New York City, New York, the son of Patrick Carroll and Mary Kelly. His family was among the oldest and best known in Yorkville.

Carroll attended P.S. No. 6 and graduated from College of St. Francis Xavier with a B.A. in 1905. He then studied law at New York Law School while teaching in public evening schools. He was involved in athletics in college, especially baseball and football. He graduated from New York Law School and was admitted to the bar that year. By 1913, he was a member of the law firm Carroll & McCormack, with offices at 256 Broadway. He vacationed on the shores of Lake Champlain, where he assisted in managing the College Camp at Cliff Haven. He was interested in politics since boyhood and gave a number of public speeches. In 1912, he was elected to the New York State Assembly as a Democrat, representing the New York County 29th District. The district was in Yorkville, which was usually a Republican stronghold. He served in the Assembly in 1913. He lost the 1913 re-election to Republican Howard Conkling.

At one point, Carroll was a member of the law firm Sheehy, Carroll and McCormick. Specializing in admiralty law, he was associated with the admiralty division of the Corporation Counsel's office. In 1913, he went to Washington, D.C. as a lawyer for the United States Department of Commerce. He later became a senior attorney of the legal division of the United States Maritime Commission, with offices at 45 Broadway, and a special assistant to the United States Attorneys for the Southern District and Eastern District of New York. He held those offices by the time he died.

Carroll died at home from a heart attack on August 15, 1942. His wife's name was May and his children were Mercedes, Catherine, and John. He was buried in Gate of Heaven Cemetery.

References

External links 

 The Political Graveyard

1882 births
1942 deaths
People from Yorkville, Manhattan
Xavier High School (New York City) alumni
New York Law School alumni
Catholics from New York (state)
20th-century American lawyers
Lawyers from New York City
20th-century American politicians
Politicians from Manhattan
Democratic Party members of the New York State Assembly
Burials at Gate of Heaven Cemetery (Hawthorne, New York)